This is a list of Canadian movie theatres operated by Cineplex Entertainment under its numerous brands, including Galaxy, Cineplex Odeon, SilverCity, Cinema City, Famous Players, Coliseum, Colossus, Scotiabank Theatre, Cineplex Cinemas, Cineplex Junxion and Cineplex VIP Cinemas.

Cineplex, however, has discontinued the Coliseum and Colossus banners, created by Famous Players in the late 1990s, replacing them with the Cineplex Cinemas banner, but the unique architectural features of these theatres have been preserved. As a result, theatres built in this fashion will feature the name of their former banner in the "Format" column of this list.

Banners

Cineplex Cinemas and Galaxy Cinemas 
Cineplex Cinemas is the company's most widespread banner, with 102 locations as of June 2015. Although 42 of these locations carry the older Cineplex Odeon banner, the concept is the same. The newest locations feature a wide variety of movies and a variety of branded concessions. Locations range from small mall multiplexes to large, ultra-modern locations. Most locations are designated in larger populated cities.

The Junxion brand combines the concept of the traditional theatre with The Rec Room entertainment restaurant. Each location has 6 screens similar to the Cineplex Cinemas format above. Only one location in Winnipeg is opened so far.

Galaxy Cinemas is the predominant brand in mid-sized markets where there has historically been little or no competition, even prior to the Cineplex-Famous Players merger. There are 30 Galaxy locations as of 2019, all of which have been built since the mid-1990s, although some were renovated from (or replaced) smaller Cineplex Odeon or Famous Players locations. These locations feature six to twelve screens, branded concessions, and stadium-style seating, with a few locations offering UltraAVX and the Waterloo location offering a separate D-Box theatre. The Galaxy Saskatoon theatre built in 2006 was rebranded as Scotiabank Theatre Saskatoon and VIP, while former Galaxy locations in Sherwood Park and Regina were rebranded as Cineplex Cinemas in 2015.

Cineplex VIP Cinemas 

Cineplex currently has 24 Cineplex VIP Cinemas presented by Scotiabank. Cineplex debuted this purpose-built concept around 1998 at Cineplex Odeon Varsity & VIP in Toronto, Ontario. VIP Cinemas are enclosed spaces separate from the rest of the theatre, but implementation varies per theatre. For example, Lansdowne is a condensed location in Ottawa that has a VIP ticket booth on the first floor and four VIP screens on one section of the third floor. The Queensway location at Etobicoke, on the other hand, has a separate building and entrance for its VIP cinemas and lounge.  Cineplex VIP Don Mills is first VIP-only location. It features five screens, three of which are 3D-capable.

The VIP area has a stylized entrance, licensed lounge, and bar with alcohol available to be served, alternative and traditional concessions food/drink products available in the lounge space, at a concession stand, and through in-theatre service. Due to the service of alcoholic beverages to guests, these spaces are only for guests who are 19+ (18+ in Alberta, Manitoba, and Quebec). Inside each auditorium, there is reserved luxury seating complete (in most locations) with wide, leather, recliner-style seats and swing-out tray tables. The movie selection is also adapted to this demographic, with a higher proportion of titles rated 14A and 18A, and such movies can even be exclusive to VIPs within locations that play them. For example, the screenings for No Escape and Straight Outta Compton at the Lansdowne location are exclusive to VIP.

Scotiabank Theatre 

 
Ten Cineplex complexes use the Scotiabank Theatre banner; though in the case of Montreal, Cinémas Banque Scotia is the main banner instead. Naming is based on the customer-loyalty program agreement made in 2007 between Cineplex and Scotiabank.

These are treated as flagship theatres for their area/region and represent a premium corporate brand within the company, offering corporate and group events to wealthier/privileged clientele such as stockholders and company executives. Each location offers pizza, coffee, TimePlay, and one to four premium large format screens featuring IMAX (except for Vancouver) and one or two UltraAVX screens (except for Ottawa, Winnipeg, and Atlantic locations). All locations feature D-Box motion picture technology in a regular (Ottawa, Montreal, Winnipeg, and Atlantic locations) or UltraAVX (others) theatre. The Scotiabank Theatre locations in Toronto, Edmonton, and Vancouver added Barco Escape premium large-format theatres in July 2016.

The first four locations in Montreal, Toronto, Calgary, and Vancouver by Famous Players were originally known as Paramount Theatres. The Paramount Theatre banner was the trademark of Paramount Pictures, the film studio of former owner Famous Players' parent company National Amusements, which also owned Viacom.

Legacy banners

Famous Players

The traditional Famous Players brand encompasses a number of different banners and theatre designs, many of which were developed during the chain's suburban expansion, such as power centres in the late 1990s. There are four Famous Players theatres as of 2022, with three to ten screens and traditional concessions at each location, located in Prince George, Prince Rupert, and LaSalle. Each theatre has two to four RealD 3D digital screens. One location, Famous Players Kildonan Place Cinemas, was converted to Famous Players Cineplex Cinemas in 2021.

Cineplex announced the closure of three Famous Players locations from 2018 to 2022:
 Famous Players Pickering was replaced with Cineplex Cinemas Pickering and VIP on July 6, 2018.
 Famous Players Canada Square opened as Cineplex Odeon Canada Square on December 20, 1985. In 2001, this location was acquired by Famous Players, and upon being reacquired by Cineplex in 2005, it retained the Famous Players branding. Its last day of operation was on October 24, 2021. The adjacent Cineplex Cinemas Yonge-Eglinton and VIP, formerly SilverCity, continue to operate.
 Famous Players Kildonan Place Cinemas was scheduled to be replaced by a new Cineplex concept, a Junxion theatre and entertainment complex, in 2021.

SilverCity and StarCité 

The group runs 12 SilverCity cinemas outside of Quebec, plus two StarCité locations in the Gatineau and Montreal cities of Quebec. The first SilverCity opened in St. Catharines on November 7, 1997, and the first StarCité opened in Gatineau in December 1999. Both brands combined peaked at 29 locations as of spring 2001. Cineplex acquired these in 2005, but divested five SilverCity and two StarCité in 2006 to fulfill regulatory requirements, only to later reacquire the previously divested Empress Walk and Gatineau locations. The company also opened three new SilverCity locations, the last being CrossIron Mills on June 30, 2010.

Each of the remaining locations features 7 to 19 screens, typically 12, of which one to three (except for Mission and Burlington) consist of premium large format screens such as IMAX or UltraAVX. Three current SilverCity locations, plus StarCité Montréal and many former SilverCity locations, feature an Xscape arcade. SilverCity theatres built by Famous Players have a rectangular design and characters hanging above, while newer SilverCity theatres have a standardized Cineplex Odeon/Galaxy Cinemas design with a red and silver motif.

A total of 32 SilverCity and StarCité locations have been built to date. Of these, more than half were either closed or rebranded. Notably, the St. Catharines location that introduced the brand was sold to Empire Theatres in 2005, while the Mississauga location closed on May 1, 2014. The StarCité at Sainte-Foy, Quebec City opened on April 12, 2000, and closed on February 27, 2007, because the Cineplex Odeon Ste-Foy next door outperformed it. Another three former SilverCity locations now carry the Scotiabank Theatre brand: the West Edmonton Mall location was rebranded on May 2, 2007, while Ottawa and the Polo Park location in Winnipeg were rebranded in June 2016.

Coliseum 

Five larger suburban theatres were originally built by Famous Players under the Coliseum banner, and are notable for their round façade. They were the first round theatres in the world with their wedge-shaped auditoriums, located on two levels, fan out from their entrances, located off the main lobby area. In the lobby, hangs several figures with costumes, objects, and characters from popular movies on display, and bright neon lights (since removed). The first location was opened in Mississauga on May 16, 1997. The second location opened in Calgary on November 27, 1998. The Ottawa, Scarborough, and Kirkland locations were opened in parts of 1999. Four of the five Coliseums that were a part of the 2005 acquisition from Cineplex have since been rebranded and renamed to Cineplex Cinemas.

The Ottawa, Scarborough, and Kirkland locations feature 12 screens, of which one is UltraAVX; Scarborough also has a D-Box screen and a second UltraAVX screen among its 12 screens. The Mississauga location has 13 screens with both 70 mm film and digital IMAX technology as well as an AVX screen. The Calgary location only has 10 screens, of which one is The Extra Experience, a competing technology by Landmark comparable to UltraAVX. Scarborough and Ottawa also each feature an Xscape Entertainment Centre, replacing the older TechTown arcades at these locations.

The former Coliseum Shawnessy in Calgary was acquired by Empire Theatres on September 30, 2005. The theatre was renamed to Studio 10 and was completely renovated on the interior. The round façade at Shawnessy remains intact but was repainted grey and white. The theatre was later sold to Landmark Cinemas on October 29, 2013.

The Ottawa and Calgary locations now feature fully reclining leather seats in all of their auditoriums.

Colossus 

Larger than Coliseum were Famous Players' three Colossus theatres, re-branded to Cineplex Cinemas in 2015. In its design, the top of the buildings has a giant UFO landing site with the flying saucer sitting on top of the foyer and flanked by lights that appear to be afterburners. Passing through the massive main entrance were automatic ticketing machines with an alien figure appearance. These are now replaced by generic Cineplex ticketing machines.

This brand focused on city suburbs and was built to challenge then-competitor AMC Theatres entry into the Canadian market. Each Colossus features 19 screens, or 18 in Laval, using the following technologies: Real D 3D (seven to eight screens), UltraAVX (one or two screens), D-Box (one screen), and IMAX (one screen, excluding Laval). The two theatres excluding Laval have a licensed lounge named "The Pod".

All locations feature an Xscape Entertainment Centre to replace their older TechTown arcades. Colossus debuted on February 12, 1999, in Vaughan, north of Toronto, Ontario. One of its screens was the first IMAX 3D theatre in Ontario. The second location opened in the Langley suburb of Vancouver on May 19, 1999. As of July 20, 2017, both of these locations offer IMAX 70 mm film playback. The final Colossus was opened in the Laval suburb of Montreal on November 17, 2000.

Other

The Cinema City brand is used at one location in Winnipeg's Garden City area that predominately shows second-run films. The former Cinema City McGillivray in Winnipeg now plays first-run films and was renamed Cineplex Odeon McGillivray and VIP Cinemas in 2012. The Cinema City Movies 12 in Edmonton closed on January 8, 2023, due to age and unpopularity, and the Cineplex Cinemas Manning Town Centre up north outperformed it as well.

Cineplex also owns a minority interest in Alliance Cinemas, in partnership with Alliance Films. At its peak the chain had five locations; three locations have been sold or closed, while the two remaining locations have been up for sale since the summer of 2005.

In February 2013, Cineplex acquired Festival Cinemas, which owned two independent cinemas in Vancouver—Fifth Avenue Cinemas and Park Theatre. In 2015, the Fifth Avenue Cinemas underwent a $2-million renovation influenced by its VIP Cinemas format.

Current theatres

Upcoming theatres

Cineplex Junxion Erin Mills (Erin Mills Town Centre, Mississauga, Ontario) — Opening in Summer 2023
Cineplex Cinemas Field Centre (St. John's, Newfoundland and Labrador) — Construction halted since 2013.
Cineplex VIP Royalmount (Montreal, Quebec) — Opening in 2023

Former theatres
The below cinemas were once owned by Cineplex Entertainment (formerly known as Galaxy Entertainment and Cineplex Galaxy LP) that were either sold or closed after its foundation in 2003.

Alberta
Calgary
Coliseum Calgary Cinemas — Opened on November 27, 1998. Sold to Empire Theatres on September 30, 2005, and again to Landmark Cinemas on October 31, 2013.
SilverCity Country Hills Cinemas — Opened on May 5, 2000. Sold to Empire Theatres on September 30, 2005, and again to Landmark Cinemas on October 31, 2013.
Edmonton
Cineplex Odeon West Mall (West Edmonton Mall) — Opened on September 27, 1985. Closed in 2008. Moved to Scotiabank Theatre Edmonton.
Cineplex Odeon City Centre (Edmonton City Centre) — Opened on July 28, 1988. Sold to Empire Theatres on September 30, 2005, and again to Landmark Cinemas on October 31, 2013.
Famous Players Gateway — Opened on December 13, 1985. Sold to Empire Theatres on September 30, 2005. Closed in 2007. Now an F2 Furnishings.
Famous Players Westmount Centre (Westmount Centre) — Opened on January 13, 1956. Twinned in 1971. Quadrupled in 1985. Sold to Empire Theatres on September 30, 2005. Closed on February 27, 2011. Currently sits abandoned as of 2021.
Cinema City Movies 12 - Opened May 17, 1996, by Cinemark, the theatre switched to second-run films a couple of months later, bought by Cinema City in 1999 which was bought by Cineplex in 2007. Closed January 8, 2023, due to age and unpopularity, with the Cineplex Cinemas Manning Town Centre up north outperforming it as well. Some of the last English movies shown at the theatre on its final days were Black Adam and DC League of Super-Pets.
Cineplex Odeon Clareview (Clareview) — Opened on December 13, 1996. Sold to Empire Theatres on September 30, 3005, and again to Landmark Cinemas on October 31, 2013. Closed in 2015. Now a GoodLife Fitness and an indoor playground.
Famous Players Park Plaza — Opened on May 22, 1968. Closed on January 10, 2010.

British Columbia
Burnaby
Famous Players Station Square (Station Square) — Opened on December 16, 1988. Closed on September 4, 2012.
Coquitlam
Famous Players Eagle Ridge — Opened on June 8, 1984. Closed in 2007.
Langley
Famous Players Willowbrook — Opened on December 4, 1981. Closed on March 9, 2006.
North Vancouver
Cineplex Cinemas Esplanade — Opened on December 21, 1990. Sold to Empire Theatres on September 30, 2005, and again to Landmark Cinemas on October 31, 2013. Bought back by Cineplex in 2016. Closed in March 2019. Moved to Cineplex Cinemas Park Royal.
Cineplex Odeon Park & Tilford — Opened on December 16, 1988. Closed on March 16, 2020, due to the COVID-19 pandemic in British Columbia. Permanent closure confirmed on May 15, 2020.
Richmond
Famous Players Richmond Centre (Richmond Centre) — Opened on November 23, 1990. Closed in 2012, now the Dining Terrace food court.
Surrey
SilverCity Guildford (Guildford Town Centre) — Opened on November 13, 1998. Sold to Empire Theatres on September 30, 2005, and again to Landmark Cinemas on October 31, 2013.
Vancouver
Cineplex Odeon Granville (Granville Street) — Opened on June 19, 1987. Sold to Empire Theatres on September 30, 2005. Closed in November 2012
Cineplex Odeon Oakridge (Oakridge Centre) — Opened on May 22, 1985. Sold to Empire Theatres on September 30, 2005. Closed on January 2, 2012.
Victoria
Famous Players Capitol — Opened on September 7, 1921. Expanded to 6 screens on June 26, 1981. Sold to Empire Theatres on September 30, 2005. Closed in 2013. Sold to independent owners in 2016.
Alliance Atlantis University Heights — Opened July 2, 1987. Sold to Empire Theatres on September 30, 3005, and again to Landmark Cinemas on October 31, 2013. Closed in March 2020 due to the COVID-19 pandemic in British Columbia. Permanent closure confirmed on July 15, 2020.

Manitoba 
Winnipeg
Famous Players Garden City (Garden City Shopping Centre) — Opened on August 12, 1970. Twinned in 1979. Closed in August 2010.
Cineplex Odeon Grant Park (Grant Park Shopping Centre) — Opened on August 13, 1969. Quadrupled on December 22, 1989. Expanded to 8 screens on August 28, 1998. Sold to Empire Theatres on September 30, 2005, and again to Landmark Cinemas on October 31, 2013.
Cineplex Odeon Drive-In — Opened on September 20, 1963. Closed in September 2007.
Famous Players Kildonan Place – Opened on November 17, 1989. Closed on December 5, 2022. Moved to Cineplex Junxion in the same mall four days later.

New Brunswick
Rothesay
Cineplex Cinemas Rothesay — Opened in 2001 as an Empire Theatres location and was acquired by Cineplex in October 2013. Cineplex closed this location on January 18, 2015, after its lease expired, focusing on the Saint John location instead.

Newfoundland and Labrador
Mount Pearl
Mount Pearl Cineplex — Opened in the late 1970s/early 1980s and was acquired by Cineplex in October 2013. Closed in June 2021 after Cineplex decided not to renew its lease.

Nova Scotia 
Amherst

 Cineplex Cinemas Amherst – Opened in 1947 and eventually expanded to three screens, this theatre was spun off by Cineplex sometime in 2022, and is now run by an independent operator as the Amherst Theatre.

Antigonish

 Cineplex Cinemas Antigonish – Opened in 1967, this single-screen theatre closed on March 16, 2020, as a result of the COVID-19 pandemic in Nova Scotia, and did not reopen when Cineplex subsequently re-opened the rest of their theatres.

Halifax
Cineplex Cinemas Oxford — Opened on March 1, 1937, this single-screen theatre was closed on September 13, 2017, after a final 7:00 p.m. showing of the 1997 film Titanic, to make way for new development after being sold to the Nahas Family of the Nanco group, with intent to convert it to residential and commercial use.  The building was ultimately repurposed, and is now home to an indoor climbing gym.

Ontario 
Barrie
Bayfield 7 — Opened in 1979. Expanded to 7 screens in the late 1980s. Closed in 2016. Moved to Cineplex Cinemas North Barrie.
Brampton
Cineplex Odeon Orion Gate Cinemas — Opened on February 19, 1999. Closed in 2018 and was converted to a Playdium in 2019.
Famous Players Gateway — Opened on October 7, 1988. Closed in 2008.
Burlington
Cineplex Odeon Showcase — Opened on March 6, 1981. Sold to Empire Theatres on September 30, 2005. Closed on April 12, 2009. Demolished in 2011.
Chatham
Famous Players Chatham — Opened in 1987. Closed on December 8, 2011. Moved to Galaxy Cinemas Chatham.
Guelph
Cineplex Odeon Stone Road Mall (Stone Road Mall) — Opened in 1989. Closed in 2004. Moved to Galaxy Cinemas Guelph.
Hamilton
Famous Players Jackson Square (Lloyd D. Jackson Square) — Opened in 1973. Expanded to 6 cinemas in 1989. Sold to Empire Theatres on September 30, 2005, and again to Landmark Cinemas on October 31, 2013.
Cineplex Odeon Upper James (Upper James Street) — Opened on April 14, 1995. Closed on December 18, 2008. Moved to SilverCity Hamilton Mountain (now Cineplex Cinemas Hamilton Mountain).
Kingston
Famous Players Capitol — Opened in 1920. Renovated in 1930. Modernized in 1967. Twinned in 1973. Quadrupled in the late 1970s. Expanded to 7 screens between 1990 and 1991. Sold to Empire Theatres on September 30, 2005. Closed in December 2012. Moved to Empire Theatres Kingston (now Landmark Cinemas Kingston).
Kitchener
SilverCity Kitchener — Opened in December 1998. Sold to Empire Theatres on September 30, 2005, and again to Landmark Cinemas on October 31, 2013.
Cineplex Odeon Fairway Centre — Opened on July 20, 1988. Expanded to 7 screens in 1997. Closed in July 2010. A larger Cineplex Cinemas opened nearby in August 2016.
Famous Players King's College — Opened in June 1987. Sold to Empire Theatres on September 30, 2005. Closed in 2006.
London
Cineplex Odeon Huron Market Place — Opened in 1989. Closed in 2008.
Famous Players Wellington — Opened in 1997. Sold to Empire Theatres on September 30, 2005, and again to Landmark Cinemas on October 31, 2013.
Markham
Cineplex Odeon First Markham Place Cinemas (First Markham Place) — Opened on December 18, 1998. Closed on April 3, 2015. Moved to Cineplex Cinemas Markham.
Mississauga
Cineplex Odeon Square One Cinemas (Square One Shopping Centre) — Opened on November 21, 2001. Sold to Empire Theatres on September 30, 2005, and again to Landmark Cinemas on October 31, 2013. Closed on October 3, 2014, to be converted to retail use.
SilverCity Mississauga Cinemas — Opened on November 28, 1997, and closed on May 1, 2014. Now a LA Fitness.
North York
Cineplex Odeon Sheppard Grande Cinemas — Opened on August 7, 1998. Closed on June 13, 2013. Moved to Cineplex Cinemas Empress Walk on the next day.
Orleans
Cineplex Odeon Orleans Town Centre — Opened on December 15, 1989. Sold to Empire Theatres on September 30, 2005. Closed on December 17, 2009. Moved to Empire Theatres Orleans (now Landmark Cinemas Orleans). Reopened by Mayfair Theatres on December 2, 2011. Closed again in February 2013. Reopened again in July 2013 by CinéStarz.
Oshawa
Famous Players Oshawa Centre (Oshawa Centre) — Opened in 1974. Quadrupled in 1979. Expanded to 8 screens in 1989. Closed in 2007.
Ottawa
Cineplex Odeon World Exchange Plaza (World Exchange Plaza) — Opened on July 5, 1991. Expanded to 7 screens in 1994. Sold to Empire Theatres on September 30, 2005, and again to Landmark Cinemas on October 31, 2013. Closed in December 2013.
Famous Players Rideau Centre (Rideau Centre) — Opened on March 18, 1983. Sold to Empire Theatres on September 30, 2005. Closed in March 2013.
Pickering
Famous Players Pickering (Pickering Town Centre) — Opened in 1998. Closed in June 2018. Moved to Cineplex Cinemas Pickering and VIP on the other side of the mall.
Richmond Hill
Cineplex Odeon Elgin Mills — Opened on December 22, 1995. Sold to Empire Theatres in 2005. Closed on August 15, 2013. Reopened by Rainbow Cinemas in November 2013. Sold again to Imagine Cinemas in 2016.
Sarnia
Famous Players Lambton Mall (Lambton Mall) — Opened in 1970. Quintupled in 1994. Expanded to 9 screens in 1996. Closed on June 6, 2013. Moved to Galaxy Cinemas Sarnia.
St. Catharines
Cineplex Odeon Fairview Mall Cinemas — Opened in 1994 and closed on January 25, 2007. Now a Winners.
SilverCity Pen Centre (The Pen Centre) — Opened on November 7, 1997. Sold to Empire Theatres on September 30, 2005. Expanded to 10 screens in 2008. Sold again to Landmark Cinemas on October 31, 2013.
Toronto
Cineplex Odeon Carlton — Opened on July 1, 1981. Renovated on May 1, 1988. Closed on December 6, 2009. Reopened on July 14th, 2010 by Magic Lantern Cinemas. Sold to Imagine Cinemas in 2016.
Windsor 
SilverCity Windsor Cinemas — Closed December 20, 2021 for COVID-19 lockdown and announced it would not reopen in January when restrictions lifted.

Quebec 
Chateauguay
Cineplex Odeon Chateauguay Encore — Opened on July 15, 1994. Closed on May 24, 2009.
Delson
Cineplex Odeon Plaza Delson — Opened on December 20, 1996. Closed in June 2016.
LaSalle
Cineplex Odeon Place LaSalle (Place LaSalle) — Opened on December 16, 1994. Closed on November 26, 2020.
Montreal
Famous Players Centre Eaton (Montreal Eaton Centre) — Opened on December 14, 1990. Closed on September 29, 2005.
Cineplex Odeon Côte-des-Neiges (Côte-des-Neiges) — Opened on August 30, 1991. Sold to Cinémas Fortune on March 31, 2006. Closed on February 4, 2010. Reopened on February 25, 2010, by CinéStarz.
Famous Players Le Parisien — Opened in 1917. Upper balcony closed on January 26, 1963. Quintupled on October 9, 1975. Expanded to 7 screen on December 15, 1989. Sold to Cinémas Fortune in 2006. Closed on April 21, 2007. Converted to retail use in 2010.
Famous Players Versailles (Place Versailles) — Opened on September 21, 1963. Twinned on November 5, 1976. Expanded to 6 screens on December 12, 1986. Closed in 2007.
Cinéma Cineplex Quartier Cavendish (Quartier Cavendish) — Opened on August 18, 1995. Sold to Cinémas Fortune on March 31, 2006. Bought back by Cineplex on February 5, 2010. Closed on November 26, 2020.
Quebec City
Famous Players Galeries de la Capitale (Galeries de la Capitale) — Opened on August 19, 1981. Expanded to 6 screens on November 16, 1990. Expanded to 12 screens on November 17, 1995. Sold to Cinémas Fortune on March 31, 2006. Shrunk down to 6 screens in January 2007. Sold to Cine-Enterprise in 2010. Closed in August 2011.
Cineplex Odeon Place Charest — Opened on September 14, 1967. Tripled on June 28, 1974. Expanded to 8 screens October 10, 1986. Shrunk down to 7 screens in late 2010. Closed on April 7, 2011. Demolished in April 2015.
Ste-Foy
StarCité Ste-Foy — Opened on April 14, 2000. Sold to Cinémas Fortune on March 31, 2006. Closed on February 28, 2007. Converted to retail space.
Trois-Rivières
Cinéma Galaxy Fleur De Lys — Opened on June 17, 1972. Expanded to 5 screens on November 22, 1991. Expanded to 9 screens on November 24, 1995. Sold to Cine-Enterprise in 2011.

Saskatchewan 
Saskatoon
Famous Players Capitol — Opened on July 13, 1983. Sold to Empire Theatres on September 30, 2005. Closed on April 3, 2008. Now houses the SNC-Lavalin offices.
Cineplex Odeon Centre (The Centre) — Opened on July 14, 1995. Closed on October 20, 2019. Moved to Cineplex Cinemas at the Centre.
Cineplex Odeon Pacific — Opened on April 22, 1988. Closed in September 2006. Demolished in 2007. Moved to Galaxy Cinemas Saskatoon (now Scotiabank Theatre Saskatoon).

Gallery

References

External links
 Cineplex Entertainment Website
 Cineplex Entertainment theatres

Movie theatre chains in Canada
Cineplex Entertainment
Cinemas and movie theatres in Canada
Cineplex Entertainment
Cineplex Entertainment
Cineplex Entertainment